Newham North West was a parliamentary constituency represented in the House of Commons of the Parliament of the United Kingdom, in the London Borough of Newham. It returned one Member of Parliament, elected by the first past the post system.

History
The constituency was created for the February 1974 general election, and abolished for the 1997 general election.  It was then merged with part of the constituency of Newham South to form the new constituency of West Ham.

Boundaries
The London Borough of Newham wards of Forest Gate, New Town, Park, Plashet, Stratford, Upton, and West Ham.

Members of Parliament

Election results

Elections in the 1970s

Elections in the 1980s

Elections in the 1990s

Notes and references

Parliamentary constituencies in London (historic)
Constituencies of the Parliament of the United Kingdom established in 1974
Constituencies of the Parliament of the United Kingdom disestablished in 1997
Politics of the London Borough of Newham